Turkey Creek School is a former school building located along Arkansas Highway 9 in Stone County, Arkansas.  It is a single-story wood-frame structure, with a metal gable roof, weatherboard siding, and a stone foundation.  The north facade has a symmetrical pair of entrances with simple trim, and the sides have five sash windows.  Although it was built in 1925, the school resembles much older rural schoolhouses.  It was used as a school until 1949, and now serves as a local community building.

The building was listed on the National Register of Historic Places in 1985.

See also
National Register of Historic Places listings in Stone County, Arkansas

References 

Educational institutions established in 1925
Defunct schools in Arkansas
Educational institutions disestablished in 1949
School buildings on the National Register of Historic Places in Arkansas
Buildings and structures in Stone County, Arkansas
National Register of Historic Places in Stone County, Arkansas